Apcar or Abgar (Armenian: Աբգար) is an Armenian name that may refer to the following notable people;
Apcar Alexander Apcar (1850–1913), Armenian businessman in India 
Abgar Ali Akbar Armani (died c.1708), Armenian merchant
Apcar Baltazar (1880–1909), Romanian painter and art critic of Armenian heritage
Abgar Barsom (born 1977), Swedish-Armenian football player
Diana Abgar (1859–1937), Armenian writer and humanitarian 
Frederic Apcar (1914–2008), Russian-born French acrobatic dancer
Virginia Apgar (1909–1974), American obstetrical anesthesiologist

See also
Apgar (surname)

Armenian-language surnames